Seiling is a city in Dewey County, Oklahoma, United States. The population was 860 at the 2010 census. The town was named in 1899 for Louis Seiling, a local store owner who had acquired a homestead in the Cheyenne-Arapaho land run of April 1892. The Hobson Town and Improvement Company established a town called Hobson, but the name was changed to Seiling in January 1899. It incorporated in 1909. Seiling is now the largest city in Dewey County. Their girls basketball team has also won the Oklahoma State Championship four times in a row (2016-2019).

History
Moreover, there were no bridges across either of the Canadian rivers until 1906. A horse racing track was built in 1903.

Geography
Seiling is located at  (36.148579, -98.925123).

Demographics

As of the 2010 census, there were 860 people, 325 households, and 216 families residing in the city. The population density was 1,000 people per square mile (400/km). There were 402 housing units at an average density of 488.6 per square mile (786.3/km). Residents self-identified as 95.1% white, 12.7% Native American, 4.9% of mixed heritage, 1.6% Asian, and 0.1% African American. Hispanic or Latino Americans made up 3.7% of the population.

There were 325 households, out of which 29.5% had children under the age of 18 living with them, 48.9% were married couples living together, 12% had a female householder with no husband present, and 33.5% were non-families. Individuals living alone accounted for 31.1% of households. The average household size was 2.58 and the average family size was 3.24. The median age was 37.9 years.

The median income for a household in the city was $45,650, and the median income for a family was $58,466. Males who were employed full-time had a median income of $43,333. Females who were employed full-time had a median income of $32,500. The per capita income for the city was $24,410. Below the poverty line were 9.7% of people, 10.3% of families, 13% of those under 18 and 11.6% of those over 64.

Economy
The local economy has been based on agriculture since the land was opened to non-Indian settlement. The major crops initially were broomcorn and cotton. Seiling soon had a cotton gin and a feed mill. Wheat and rye became important crops before World War I. In 1918, the Seiling Milling Company opened a flour mill and marketed "White Rose Special" flour until it closed in 1952.

Transportation
Seiling is on US-60, US-270, US-281, SH-3, and SH-51, some of which run concurrently through the town.  US-183 is immediately to the west.  Thus the town bills itself as the “Crossroads of Northwest Oklahoma.” 
 
Seiling Airport (FAA Identifier: 1S4) is immediately adjacent to Seiling on the northwest.

Parks and recreation
Seiling City Park is in the town, located on Seiling Creek. 

The 9-hole Seiling Golf Course was built in 1980.

The Seiling Swimming Pool is open to the general public, and for special event rental.

Canton Lake is to the east.

Little Sahara State Park is about a half-hour to the north.

Notable people
 Gary England, meteorologist for KWTV-News 9
 Carrie Nation, Prohibition advocate
 Tom L. Ward, oil and gas businessman
 Jordy Mercer, Major League Baseball Player
Gary Gore, owner Gore Nitrogen.

References

Cities in Dewey County, Oklahoma
Cities in Oklahoma
1899 establishments in Oklahoma Territory